Senator Peltier may refer to:

Harvey Peltier Jr. (1923–1980), Louisiana State Senate
Harvey Peltier Sr. (1899–1977), Louisiana State Senate
Wanda Jo Peltier (born 1933), Oklahoma State Senate